Edward Nathan Calisch (1865 in Toledo, Ohio – 1946 in Richmond, Virginia) was a prominent American Reform Rabbi.

Calisch studied at the University of Cincinnati and was ordained as Rabbi after graduating in the second graduating class of Hebrew Union College.

In 1887, Calisch accepted a pulpit in Peoria, Illinois. In 1891, he became rabbi of Congregation Beth Ahabah in Richmond, Virginia.

In 1893, Calisch's congregation felt the need for a more modern prayer ritual. They authorized Calisch to revise a prayer-book. That prayer book was the first Hebrew book printed in Richmond.

In 1908, Calisch earned a Ph.D from the University of Virginia.

Calisch was a prominent figure in Richmond's civic life, where his talents as an orator were much in demand. In 1915 he gave a speech in support of women's suffrage from the steps of the state capitol.

He was an executive member of the American Jewish Committee, the Jewish Welfare Board, the Joint Distribution Committee and the Virginia War History Commission.

In 1945, after more than four decades of service, Calisch retired.

References

Goldman, Yosef. Hebrew Printing in America, 1735-1926, A History and Annotated Bibliography (YGBooks 2006). .

1865 births
1946 deaths
Religious leaders from Richmond, Virginia
American Reform rabbis
University of Cincinnati alumni
Hebrew Union College – Jewish Institute of Religion alumni
University of Richmond alumni
20th-century American rabbis
19th-century American rabbis